Liliana Cavani (born 12 January 1933) is an Italian film director and screenwriter. She belongs to a generation of Italian filmmakers from Emilia-Romagna that came into prominence in the 1970s, including Bernardo Bertolucci, Pier Paolo Pasolini and Marco Bellocchio. Cavani became internationally known after the success of her 1974 feature film Il portiere di notte (The Night Porter). Her films have historical concerns. In addition to feature films and documentaries, she has also directed opera.

Early life
Cavani was born in Carpi, near Modena in the regione of Emilia-Romagna. Cavani's father, an architect from Mantua, belonged to a conservative bourgeois family of landowners. "My father was an architect interested in urban development. He took me to museums. He had worked in urban planning in Baghdad in 1956, when Iraq was still under British control. My mother was very strong, very capable, and very sweet", Cavani explained in an interview. Her mother was passionate about films and took her to the movies every Sunday from an early age. On her mother's side, Cavani came from a working-class family of militant antifascists. Her maternal grandfather, a syndicalist, introduced her to the works of Engels, Marx and Bakunin.

She graduated in literature and philology at Bologna University in 1959, writing a dissertation on the fifteenth-century poet and nobleman Marsilio Pio. She had intended to become an archeologist, a profession she soon abandoned in order to pursue her passion for the moving image. She attended Rome's renowned "Centro Sperimentale di Cinematografia", (Experimental Cinematography Center) inaugurated by Benito Mussolini prior to World War II. She studied documentary filmmaking and obtained her diploma with the short films Incontro notturno (1961), about the friendship between two men, a white man and a Senegalese, and L'evento (1962) about a group of tourists who killed for fun.

Film career and later life

Early films (1961–1965)
While attending film school, Cavani won a competition at RAI, Italy's national television network, and took a job there as a director of historical documentaries in 1961. Her professional career thus began making documentaries for RAI between 1961 and 1965, which included Storia del III Reich, (History of the Third Reich) (1962–1963), which chronicles the rise of the Nazi regime. 

It was the first historical investigation of German totalitarianism to appear on television. Other documentaries are: L'età di Stalin ("The Stalin Years"), an investigation into the Soviet leader's years; La donna nella Resistenza (1965); Philippe Pétain, processo a Vichy, winner of the Golden Lion at Venice film festival in 1965 in the documentary section. In this period she also made Il giorno della pace, a four-hour documentary on immigration south-to-north within Italy.

Francesco d'Assisi (1966)
Cavani made her first full-length feature film in 1966 with Francis of Assisi (Francesco d'Assisi). Made for television and aired in two parts, it was deeply influenced by the style of Rossellini and the atmosphere typical of the films of Pasolini. Made in a period of political unrest, it was to become a kind of manifesto of dissenting Catholicism. Starring Lou Castel, it portrays Francis of Assisi as a slightly depressed protester and an avid, albeit mad, supporter of armed brotherhood. The ideal defender of the 1968 student movement. The film was a great success, but also triggered many negative reactions. It was called " heretical, blasphemous and offensive for the faith of the Italian people". It was the first of many polemical reaction to Cavani's work.

Galileo (1968) 
Her next film, Galileo (1968), focuses on the seventeenth-century conflict between science and religion. Galileo Galilei's belief that the truth should be proved by experimental methods, makes him clash with the dogmas of the church and he falls into the hands of the Inquisition. The film, originally made for television, was banned by the Italian censor, that considered it anticlerical and was never aired, but it found a distributor and it was released in theaters.

The Cannibals (1970) 
The Cannibals (I Cannibali) (1970), Cavani's first film to rely on an independent production company, uses the myth of Antigone to present the contemporary political state of Italy.  Inspired by Sophocles' Antigone, the film, set in the industrial city of Milan, recounts the struggle of a girl against the authorities that prevents burying the bodies of rebels killed by the police, to serve as a warning to its citizens. The brave girl, the only rebel in a city crushed by dictatorship, is aided by a mysterious man who speaks an unknown language. The example of this two youngsters is soon followed by others. This work was not very well received by the public, so Cavani returned to television with the series of documentaries I bambini e noi (1970).

The Guest (1971)
Cavani's subsequent film L’ospite (The Guest; 1971), furthered her interest in social and psychological themes. The plot centers on the relationship between a writer and a woman, a former mental asylum patient struggling to fit back in society. The film, starring Lucia Bosè, was made on a shoestring budget. It was shown at the Venice film festival out of competition.

Milarepa (1973) 
The director undertook a venture into Oriental mystical experiences with Milarepa (1973). A story inspired in a classic text of Tibetan literature, Milarepa moves back and forth in time between the story of the title character, a mystic of the eleventh century and a young westerner whose travails are not very different, both being torn between the search for knowledge and a quest for power. The film was praised by Pier Paolo Pasolini who called it a "truly beautiful film".

The Night Porter (1974)
Cavani was not well known beyond Italy until she made the 1974 film The Night Porter (Il portiere di notte), which remains the film for which she is best remembered. The plot, set in Vienna in 1957, follows an SS camp guard and a former concentration camp survivor engaging in a sadomasochistic relationship after meeting again by a chance encounter. A deeply controversial film, it starred Dirk Bogarde and Charlotte Rampling. 

American critic Roger Ebert called it "despicable", and both major New York critics, Pauline Kael (The New Yorker) and Vincent Canby (The New York Times) dismissed it as "junk". However, in Europe, the film was hailed as a ground-breaking attempt to probe the unsettling sexual and psychological ambiguities generated by war.

Beyond Good and Evil (1977) 
In 1977 she made Beyond Good and Evil (Al di là del bene e del male), which recounts the intense relationship between German philosophizer Friedrich Nietzsche, his friend author Paul Rée and Russian writer and feminist Lou Andreas-Salomé. They meet in Rome in 1882 and move to Germany in a failed ménage à trois while attempting to live their lives and satisfy their intellectual needs rejecting morality. Nietzsche goes mad from a venereal disease and Paul discovers his repressed homosexuality with tragic consequences. Lou, the most liberated of the three, following the banner of feminism, is the only survivor. The film, starring Dominique Sanda, Erland Josephson and Robert Powell, was entangled in controversy.

In 1979 she began directing operas with Wozzeck in Florence; since then she has produced and directed several operas for many theaters in Europe. Subsequent operas include Iphigénie en Tauride (1984) and Medea (1986) at the Opera of Paris; Cardillac (1991) in Florence; La vestale (1993) at the Teatro alla Scala in Milan; and La cena delle beffe (1995) in Zürich.

The Skin (1981)
Her 1981 film, La Pelle (The Skin), was based on the eponymous novel by Curzio Malaparte. Shown in competition for the Palme d'Or at the Cannes Film Festival, it was aimed at the international market with a star-studded cast, including Marcello Mastroianni, Claudia Cardinale, Carlo Giuffrè and Burt Lancaster. The film is set during the American occupation of Naples in 1944 during World War II.

Beyond the Door (1982) 
The plot of 1982's Beyond the Door (Oltre la porta), set in North Africa, follows a love triangle between Mathew, an American oil ring worker in love with Nina, a young woman entangled in an affair with her stepfather Enrico, an Italian diplomat who is in jail for the death of Nina's mother. The film, starring Marcello Mastroianni, Tom Berenger and Eleonora Giorgi, disappointed audiences and critics.

The Berlin Affair (1985) 
The Berlin Affair (Interno berlinese), made in 1985, was loosely based on the novel Quicksand by Jun'ichirō Tanizaki. Set in Berlin in 1938, on the verge of war, the film tells the story of a German official working for the foreign office and his wife, both of whom are seduced by the young daughter of the Japanese Ambassador to the Third Reich and are dragged into a perverse love triangle.

The film continued Cavani's interest in transgressive relationships. It was the third part of her trilogy of films with a German setting that began with The Night Porter and continued with Beyond Good and Evil.

Francesco (1989) 
With Francesco (1989) Liliana Cavani returned to the life of St Francis of Assisi in a film starring American actor Mickey Rourke as the title character, and English actress Helena Bonham-Carter as Chiara. The film bore little stylistic resemblance to Cavani's earlier efforts.

In the 1990s Cavani became more interested in staging operas, and devoted less time to filmmaking. She returned to her television roots and directed three TV opera production: Verdi's La Traviata (1992), Cavalleria rusticana on Pietro Mascagni (1996) and Puccini's Manon Lescaut (1998).

Where Are You? I'm Here (1993) 
Where Are You? I'm Here (Dove siete? Io sono qui) (1993), recounts the love story of Fausto and Elena two deaf youngsters from different backgrounds. He belongs to a wealthy family who has raised him as if he were not deaf, while she comes from a more humble working-class family and has to struggle to complete her education. Set in contemporary Italy, the film is similar to The Cannibals and The Guest in its exploration of the themes of silence and isolation. Like many of Cavani's films, it includes the use of dance.

Ripley's Game (2002) and current activity
In 2002, Cavani made Ripley's Game (Il Gioco di Ripley), based on the novel of the same name by Patricia Highsmith, a sequel to The Talented Mr. Ripley. Ripley’s Game, was presented out of competition at the Venice Film Festival.

Cavani currently lives in Rome. Carpi, her hometown, has established the Associazione Fondo Liliana Cavani, where her films are preserved and made available for consultation.

Filmography as director

See also
 List of female film and television directors
 List of LGBT-related films directed by women

References

Further reading
 Armstrong, Richard; Charity, Tom; Hughes, Lloyd; Winter, Jessica. The Rough Guide to Film, Rough Guides, 2007; 
 Bruneta, Gian Piero. The History of Italian Cinema: A Guide to Italian films from its origins to the twenty first century. Princeton University Press, 2011; 
 Bonadella, Peter. Italian Cinema: from the Neorealism to the present. Continuum New York, 1988; 
 Marrone, Gaetana. The Gaze and the Labyrinth: the Cinema of Liliana Cavani. Princenton Paperbacks, 2000;

External links
 

1933 births
Italian atheists
Italian women film directors
Italian film directors
Italian screenwriters
Living people
Film people from the Province of Modena
People from Carpi, Emilia-Romagna
Centro Sperimentale di Cinematografia alumni
English-language film directors